Nemacheilus singhi is a species of ray-finned fish in the stone loach genus Nemacheilus, although some authorities place it in the genus Schistura. This species has only been recorded from a single locality in Nagaland, India.

References
 

singhi
Fish described in 1987
Taxobox binomials not recognized by IUCN